Live in Atlantic City may refer to:

Live in Atlantic City (Beyoncé video), 2013
Live in Atlantic City (Heart album), 2019